Spooge may refer to:

a slang term for semen
Spooge (Breaking Bad), a character from the American television series Breaking Bad
Spouge: a form of Caribbean music particularly associated with Barbados